Orculella ignorata is a species of air-breathing land snail, a terrestrial pulmonate gastropod mollusc in the family Orculidae.

Geographic distribution
The native distribution of O. ignorata includes the northern part of the mainland, the island of Thasos and the eastern Aegean Islands in Greece, the south-western part of Bulgaria and the south and western coasts of Anatolia in Turkey.

See also
List of non-marine molluscs of Greece
List of non-marine molluscs of Bulgaria
List of non-marine molluscs of Turkey

References 

Orculidae
Molluscs of Europe
Fauna of Turkey
Gastropods described in 1996